Ergalatax crassulnata, common name : the coarse cronia, is a species of sea snail, a marine gastropod mollusk in the family Muricidae, the murex snails or rock snails.

Description
The shell size varies between 25 mm and 35 mm

Distribution
This species is distributed in the Gulf of Carpentaria, Australia

References

External links
 

Ergalatax
Gastropods described in 1915